The Ford Evos is a coupe-style plug-in hybrid grand tourer concept car unveiled to the public at the September 2011 Frankfurt Motor Show by Ford Europe.

The exterior design, referred to as Kinetic 2.0, was carried out by Stefan Lamm under the leadership of Ford of Europe's executive design director Martin Smith. The car features four gull-wing doors and is not intended for production. However, Ford announced that the design strategy showcased in the Evos will appear on production cars in a few months.

The Evos is powered by a plug-in hybrid electric powertrain which consists of a 2.0-liter Atkinson cycle gasoline engine, electric motor and lithium-ion battery pack.

Overview

The evos is a four-door, four-seat coupé that was designed by Stefan Lamm, Martin Smith and Eugen Enns as a further development from "Kinetic Design". Like the previous Ford Iosis study, the vehicle has gull-wing doors hinged in opposite directions and no B-pillar. The plug-in hybrid is driven either by a gasoline or an electric motor, and the energy is stored in a lithium-ion battery developed by Ford. The drive is not a study, it was taken over from the Ford C-Max Energi, which went into series production in 2013.

The full-LED headlights, which was to be available in Ford series vehicles in the future, are kept very flat and thus appear slit-shaped, the grille is trapezoidal and not drawn down as far as on the current Ford models. Wide-flared wheel arches give the vehicle a very sporty impression. At the rear of the car there is a continuous strip of taillights, including a centrally arranged, likewise trapezoidal exhaust and a large, silver-colored diffuser.

There are four bucket seats in the interior and the fittings are completely digital. At higher speeds, less important information is automatically hidden to reduce the risk of distraction. The playlist of the audio system, as well as settings for the air conditioning, seat position and even the desired coordination of steering, chassis and transmission should be set fully automatically to the driver via cloud access. The electronics use the seats to determine the driver's pulse rate while driving and adapt the car to its physical condition; special filter systems also protect the occupants from unclean air.

See also

Ford C-Max Energi
Ford Focus Electric
List of modern production plug-in electric vehicles
Plug-in electric vehicle

References

External links
 Official Ford Evos website

Evos
Plug-in hybrid vehicles
Grand tourers
Cars introduced in 2011
Coupés